Wickersley School and Sports College is a coeducational secondary school and sixth form with academy status, located in Wickersley in the Metropolitan Borough of Rotherham, South Yorkshire, England.

The school has 2,150 pupils, aged 11–18, and 171 teachers. Wickersley also houses a resource base for Secondary Hearing Impaired Pupils, which has placed a further 14 pupils. The head teacher is now Tony Hardcastle. The school is the lead partner in Wickersley Partnership Trust, supporting Clifton and Rawmarsh Schools in Rotherham.

Ofsted inspections
Since the commencement of Ofsted inspections in September 1993, the school has undergone five full inspections:

Headteachers
 Mr A Matthews, 1969–1979
 Mr S Carter JP, 1979–1989
 Mr J T Deeley, 1989 – December 2001
 David Hudson, January 2002 – 2014
 Elaine Renavent 2014–2021
 Tony Hardcastle 2021–

References

External links
Official site

Secondary schools in Rotherham
Academies in Rotherham